Jay Ruby (October 25, 1935 – February 23, 2022) was an American scholar who was a professor in the Department of Anthropology at Temple University until his retirement in 2003.  He received his B.A. in History (1960) and Ph.D. in Anthropology (1969) from the University of California, Los Angeles.

He was a leader in the field of visual anthropology.

Fieldwork and research
As an archaeologist, Ruby conducted excavations in the American Southwest, West Mexico and the Republic of the Sudan.  As a music critic and journalist, he interviewed pop music musicians, wrote album reviews and articles for the magazine Jazz and Pop. As an ethnographer of visual culture, he conducted long term participant-observation in Central Pennsylvania and Oak Park, a suburb of Chicago. Larry Gross, USC and Ruby edited enhanced ebook, The Complete Sol Worth. In the fall of 2008, Ruby began a study of Bohemian Southern California that resulted in three books (see below).

Filmography
A Country Auction: The Paul V. Leitzel Sale (1983)
Can I Get A Quarter? (1983)
Rebekah and Sophie: A Lesbian Family (2005)
Taylor Family Portrait (2005)
Dear Old Oak Parkers (2006)
Oak Park Regional Housing Center (2006)
Val (2006)
Country Auction Study Film: Reflexive Musings (2010)

Major publications
Editor, A Crack in the Mirror: Reflexive Perspectives in Anthropology. Philadelphia:  University of Pennsylvania Press. 1982
Editor, Robert J. Flaherty, A Biography. Written by Paul Rotha.  Philadelphia:  University of Pennsylvania Press. 1983
Editor with Larry Gross and John Katz.  Image Ethics: The Moral Rights of Subjects  in Photographs, Film and Television. New York: Oxford University Press. 1988
Editor, The Cinema of John Marshall, Routledge. 1993 
Secure the Shadow: Death and Photography in America.  Cambridge: MIT Press. 1995
The World of Francis Cooper: Nineteenth Century Pennsylvania Photographer.  University Park: Penn State University Press. 1999
Picturing Culture: Essays on Film and Anthropology.  Chicago: University of Chicago Press. 2000
Editor with Larry Gross and John Katz.  Image Ethics in the Digital World.  Minneapolis: University of Minnesota Press. 2003
Editor with Marcus Banks. Made to Be Seen: Historical Perspectives on Visual Anthropology. Chicago: University of Chicago Press. 2011
Coffee House Positano: A Bohemian Oasis in Malibu 1957-1962. Boulder: University of Colorado Press. 2013
Editor with Larry Gross. The Complete Sol Worth.Los Angeles:USC Annenberg Press. 2013
 The Property: Malibu's Other Colony. 2016.
Editor,  Bohemia in Southern California.

See also
Tim Asch
Barbara Myerhoff

Notes

References
Ruby, Jay. "The Professionalization of Visual Anthropology in the United States - The 1960s and 1970s" .  Visual Anthropology Review, vol. 17, No. 2:5-12, 2002.
"Out of Sync: The Cinema of Tim Asch" . Picturing Culture: Essays on Film and Anthropology. Chicago: University of Chicago Press, 2000.
"The belly of the beast: Eric Michaels and the anthropology of visual communication" . Continuum: The Australian Journal of Media & Culture, vol. 3 no 2 (1990).
"Visual Anthropology" . In Encyclopedia of Cultural Anthropology, David Levinson and Melvin Ember, editors. New York: Henry Holt and Company, vol. 4:1345–1351, 1996.
"Introduction, by Barbara Myerhoff and Jay Ruby" . A Crack in the Mirror: Reflexive Perspectives in Anthropology. Philadelphia: University of Pennsylvania Press, 1982.
"Exposing yourself: Reflexivity, anthropology, and film" .  Semiotica 30½ (1980), pp. 153–179.

External links
Personal Website 
Doing his homework: A Saturday morning conversation with Jay Ruby
Documentary Educational Resources Filmmaker Profile

1935 births
Living people
American anthropologists
Visual anthropologists
Temple University faculty
University of California, Los Angeles alumni